Marguerite Rutten (18 October 1898, Paris - 07 April 1984, Nice) was a French archaeologist and Assyriologist.

Biography
“Maggie” Rutten, of Dutch ancestry, studied first at the Institut Catholique de Paris (diplome 1930). Then she spent her entire career at the Louvre, first as a chargé de mission in the Department of Oriental Antiquities. 

She graduated from the École du Louvre in 1933. She then became an attaché and in 1934 published a Guide to Oriental Antiquities in the Louvre Museum. She was one of the main actors of Charles Fossey's conference at the École pratique des hautes études and obtained the title of graduate student with a work under his direction (Contracts from the Seleucid period in the Louvre Museum). This book attracted the attention of André Aymard, “who thanked Miss Rutten for having accompanied her copies with translations and transcriptions, thus allowing Hellenists to have access to this documentation”. She became a lecturer in Sumerian and Asyrian epigraphy and published an introductory manual on Accadian. In 1937 she became Georges Contenau's assistant and in 1940, she was a substitute teacher at the École du Louvre for André Parrot, who had been mobilised. For thirty years, she also taught public art history courses on oriental archaeology at the École du Louvre in the evenings, as part of the Rachel Boyer Foundation.

She died in Nice in 1984 where she spent the last twenty years of her life.

Works
 Éléments d'accadien (assyro-babylonien), notions de grammaire (1937), Adrien-Maisonneuve, Paris, 1937.
 Babylone, Paris, Presses Universitaires de France, Paris, 1948, 32 editions published between 1948 and 1966 in 3 languages.
 La science des Chaldéens, Presses universitaires de France, Paris, 1960.
 Les arts du Moyen-Orient ancien, Paris, Presses Universitaires de France, Paris, 1963.

Distinctions
  Officer of the Ordre des Arts et des Lettres

Notes

References

1898 births
1984 deaths
20th-century French women
French Assyriologists
French women archaeologists